"Killing Time" is a song by American thrash metal band Megadeth. It was released as the sixth single from their sixteenth studio album, The Sick, the Dying... and the Dead!, on December 16, 2022.

Release 
"Killing Time" was originally announced as the lead single for The Sick, the Dying... and the Dead! in March 2022. However, after the album release date was pushed back, the band decided to release We'll Be Back instead. The clips of "We'll Be Back" were still thought to be that of "Killing Time", up until the former was released.

In December 2022, the song was announced to be getting a music video. The video was released on December 26 of that same year.

Lyrics 
"Killing Time" focuses on one of Dave Mustaine's ex partners.

"Psychopathy" (Killing Time's intro/album interlude) was inspired by how "(when) doctors diagnose a child with ADD or ADHD, they’re off to the races with the psycho-pharmaceuticals to help them while they’re at school. In the long run, though, it just makes them worse." Mustaine also said that the two songs are about "a man who’s just lost everything", one who, with every action, "(strips) back the paint trying to cover up the mess that (they are)."

Music video 
"Killing Time" was released as the fifth part in a music video series depicting the origin of Vic Rattlehead, Megadeth's mascot. As with the other videos, it was directed by Leo Liberti. The video features Rattlehead fighting his way through many different wars in history. He uses anything he can, including swords and his bare hands.

Personnel 
Megadeth
 Dave Mustaine – rhythm and lead guitars, lead vocals, additional bass
 Kiko Loureiro – lead guitar, backing vocals
 Dirk Verbeuren – drums

Additional musicians
 Steve Di Giorgio – bass
 Brandon Ray – additional vocals
 Eric Darken – percussion
 Roger Lima – keyboards, effects

Technical personnel
 Dave Mustaine – co-production, engineering, art concept
 Chris Rakestraw – co-production, engineering
 Lowell Reynolds – assistant engineering
 Maddie Harmon – assistant engineering
 Rick West – drum technician 
 Josh Wilbur – mixing
 Ted Jensen – mastering

References

External links 
Music video

Megadeth songs
2022 songs
2022 singles
Songs written by Dave Mustaine